Agoshevka is a rural locality (a selo) in Valuysky District, Belgorod Oblast, Russia. The population was 106 as of 2010. There are 6 streets.

Geography 
Agoshevka is located 6 km west of Valuyki (the district's administrative centre) by road. Yablonovo is the nearest rural locality.

References 

Rural localities in Valuysky District